Oakland Senior High School (also known as O-High or OHS) is a public high school in Oakland, California. Established in 1869, it is the oldest high school in Oakland and the sixth oldest high school in the state.

History

Oakland High was first located at 12th Street and Market Street, then at 12th and Jefferson Street. It has been at its current location at the corner of MacArthur Boulevard and Park Boulevard since 1928. The building that stood before its current manifestation was known as the "Pink Prison" or "Pink Palace." The stairway leading up from Park Boulevard is what remains of the exterior. The lamps in the commons are original fixtures. What is now the football field and basketball courts was once classrooms and a huge theater. The school colors are royal blue and white.

The building was torn down in 1980 to be rebuilt as a safer structure in the event of a major earthquake.

A new football/soccer/baseball field was inaugurated in the spring of 2006.  The football field is officially known as the "Jackie Jensen Field", while the baseball/softball field is dedicated to Mike Marcoulis Sr., longtime coach and teacher.

Pamela Moy became Oakland High's principal in Fall 2020, succeeding Matin Abdel-Qawi, who was the principal serving from 2012 to 2020. As of October 2021, the assistant principals are Jose Irizarry III, Chris Johnston, Rita Skyers, and Shoshana Towers-Cabrera. Other administrative positions include Rany Ath (Wellness Center Director).

In the summer of 2008, renovations and rebuilding to the main building (as well in the former shop buildings) began and were completed in August 2011.

In January 2021, filmmaker Peter Nicks released Homeroom, a documentary following the Oakland High class of 2020 through their senior year. The 2019–2020 school year started normally but made an unexpected turn in March 2020 as a result of the COVID-19 pandemic, forcing the students into quarantine and to attend virtual classes, with no prom or graduation ceremony.

Students
With over 1,800 students, 39% are Asian, including students of Chinese, Vietnamese, Cambodian, Filipino, Mien, and Laotian descent. Another 38% of students are African American/Black, 21% of students are Latino or Hispanic, 1% are white and 1% are of two or more ethnicities.

Class colors
Freshmen:  purple
Sophomores:  yellow
Juniors:  green
Seniors:  blue

Student life
Oakland High School has more than 40 student-run clubs and 24 sports.

Clubs

Academics
OHS offers many Advanced Placement (AP) courses and a wide array of challenging academic electives. Many concurrent enrollment college courses are offered from the Peralta Colleges after school.

The AP Test Site Coordinator for the school is Carlos Padilla.

AP courses

Test scores
For 2013, the school's API score was 634 out of a possible 1,000 points.

Families and Pathways
Ninth-grade students are parts of learning communities called freshman "families". Students in grades 10 to 12 join one of the school's Career and Technical Education (CTE), aligned pathway programs:

Visual Arts & Academic Magnet Program (VAAMP)
VAAMP is an art-based academy; it teaches student how to be creative and piques their interest in art. It offers students classes in art, fashion, drama, and graphic design. VAAMP students painted a mural on Park Blvd. entitled "Beautiful Struggle."

Environmental Science Academy (ESA)
The Environmental Science Academy (ESA) at Oakland High was founded in 1997. ESA is known for its hands-on learning and field trips including regular sophomore water quality monitoring at Lake Merritt and an annual trip to Catalina Island. Students are given various tools to prepare themselves for the future, such as community service, college courses, and School-to-Career. Sophomore ESA students usually have a block class consisting of Chemistry and Environmental Studies.

Public Health Academy (PHA)
Established in 2011, the Public Health Academy is the newest academy at Oakland High School. Its goal is to teach students about public health and policy. Public health problems involve complex and interrelated social, behavioral, legal, medical and economic issues. Students are given opportunities for internships in the health profession at Highland Hospital and Kaiser Permanente. balls

Innovative Design & Engineering Academy (IDEA)
IDEA engages student learning in engineering and technology through rigorous curriculum, real-world applications, and relevant field trips. This pathway was formerly known as Project Lead The Way Engineering (PLTW).

Law & Social Justice
LSJ prepares students for careers in education, law, and community organizations with a focus on social justice and current events.

RISE Academy
R.I.S.E. (Recent Immigrant Support and Engagement) Academy welcomes newly arrived immigrant students and provides them with a sheltered space that supports their transition into the American high school education system. Unlike the other pathways, RISE includes students from all four grade levels.

Athletics
In the 2008–2009 season, the Oakland High football team managed a 9–2 record, winning a co-league championship.

In the spring of 1998, 2007 and 2009, the badminton team defeated Skyline High School (the seven-year defending champions) to become the OAL champions. They won the league with a record of six wins and no losses. Along with athletic talent, the badminton team also maintained a very high average GPA, and were named Oakland High's 2007 Outstanding Spring Sports Team.

The Oakland High Catfish Swim Team is another of the many strong teams at Oakland High School. The Catfish have roughly 40 people on the Varsity and JV teams. At the 2008 OAL finals, the Catfish defeated Skyline in both men's Varsity and JV, becoming OAL champions.

In the fall of 2007, the bowling team became OAL champions without a single loss.

The Lady Wildcats Volleyball team finished third in the OAL for the 2014 season.

In 2002, the basketball team played Dela Sale in the State Champions Semi-Finals. They also won the OAL (Oakland Athletic League) basketball against Oakland Tech High School in 2000. And In 2023 the Oakland highschool wildcats Won the Dlll State championship

Sports

Notable alumni

 Herbert Anderson, actor, Dennis The Menace television series.
 Carroll Borland (1931), actress, author, Professor of Education
 Jabari Brown (2011), Los Angeles Lakers basketball player
 Chris Burford (1955), NFL player and NCAA Football Hall of Fame
 Sway Calloway, rapper and radio personality
 David Carradine (1954), actor
 King Lan Chew (1921), dancer
 George Cooper Pardee (1875), Governor of California, 1903–1907
 Denny Dent (1966), painter
 Sheila E., percussionist
 Ralph Edwards (1930), television producer
 Ben Fong-Torres (1962), journalist
 Shirley Fong-Torres (1964), chef, tour operator, and popular travel and food writer
 Chick Gandil (1906), professional baseball player
 Paul Gemignani (1955), jazz drummer and Broadway music director
 Sylvia Gerrish (as Lillian Rollins), (1878), musical comedy actress
 Lillian Moller Gilbreth (1896), industrial engineer
 Bob Grottkau, NFL player and college coach
 George J. Hatfield (1907), Lieutenant Governor of California, 1935–39
 Marsha Hunt (1964), actress, singer and novelist
 Jackie Jensen (1945), athlete, College Football Hall of Fame, 1958 AL MVP
 Franklin Knight Lane (1880), US Secretary of Interior, 1913–1920
 Fay Lanphier (1924), Miss California, 1924 and 1925; Miss America, 1925
 Damian Lillard (2008), Portland Trail Blazers basketball player and rapper
 Jack London (1896), writer
 Lorenzo Lynch, NFL football player
 Judah Leon Magnes (1894), rabbi, Chancellor/President Hebrew University, Jerusalem 1925-1948
 Dudley Manlove (1931), vaudeville, radio and B-movie actor
 Yōsuke Matsuoka (1896), Japanese Minister of Foreign Affairs during WWII
 Armand Mauss (1946), sociologist
 Stanley Mazor (1959), engineer
 Ken McAlister, NFL football player and college basketball player
 Edwin Meese (1949), US Attorney General, 1985–1988
 Clark Miller (1955), NFL football player
 Julia Morgan (1890), architect
 Lloyd Moseby (1978), Major League baseball player
 Robert Nichols, actor
 Zoe Ann Olsen-Jensen (1949), Olympic diver; silver medal, 1948; bronze medal, 1952
 Walter Plunkett (1919), 1951 Academy Award for Costume Design for An American in Paris
 Bill Rigney (1936), New York Giants player and first manager of the San Francisco Giants, 1956
 Boots Riley, rapper, producer, screenwriter, film director, and activist
 Dawn Robinson (attended), singer; founding member of R&B vocal group En Vogue.
 Gertrude Stein (1892), author
 Ellery W. Stone (1912), Rear admiral and Radio pioneer
 Nellie Wong (1952), poet

See also
 List of Oakland, California high schools

References

External links
 OHS Memorial Pages
 Oakland High School
 Wildcats Alumni Association - the official alumni association
 Visual Arts Academy Magnet Program (VAAMP)
 ESA

High schools in Oakland, California
Educational institutions established in 1869
Public high schools in California
1869 establishments in California
Oakland Unified School District